Pinkhus Rovner (1875–1919) was a Jewish Ukrainian Bolshevik revolutionary. He also was known under his aliases Akim or Akimov.

Biography
Born in 1875 the native of Mykolaiv, Pinkhus Lazarevych Rovner was a worker at one of the Mykolaiv shipbuilding factories. In 1902 he joined the workers' movement and in the next year became a member of the RSDLP. In 1903 the gendarmerie of Mykolaiv opened a file on him when a 32-year-old mechanic, Rovner, was arrested for spreading illegal literature and being a member of the RSDLP. On August 6, 1906 Rovner was detained again among 13 other participants of the meeting at 20 First Cartwright Street in Mykolaiv. After three months of arrest he was exiled to Olonets Governorate.

In 1908 Rovner returned to Mykolaiv along with Filipp Andreev, Ivan Chigrin and other Bolsheviks to reestablish the RSDLP(b) committee in the city. Since September 1908 along with Andreev he published the underground newspaper Struggle with a circulation of 5,000 copies, releasing a total of four issues of the newspaper. The newspaper was printed at a well conspired typography "Manya" located underground of the Petrov's brothers estate on the 11th Military Street.

Akim was freed by the 1917 February Revolution out of his last exile to Yenisei Governorate, after which he moved to Petrograd and soon thereafter back home to Mykolaiv. In March 1918 Rovner participated in a local uprising after extinguishing of which most members of the local RSDLP(b) had perished. On July 12, 1918 he joined the Communist Party (bolsheviks) of Ukraine, becoming a member of its central committee. 

With the advance of the Armed Forces of South Russia, the Red Army lost several key cities such as Kharkiv and Katerynoslav in June 1919, while the Volunteer Army continued its advance into two main strategic directions: one - Kiev, another - Mykolaiv and Odessa. On July 7, 1919 the Council of Workers'-Peasants' Defense announced the above-mentioned cities in a state of siege, while the Communist Party of Ukraine sent special commissioners Pinkhus Rovner and Isaak Shvarts to prepare a defense. In August 1919 however the Red Army units were defeated near Kherson and Mykolaiv by the Russian General Nikolai Shilling. Some units managed to retreat to Odessa where they became surrounded by the advancing White Guards and armed forces of the Ukrainian People's Republic. On August 18, 1919 Denikin's forces occupied Mykolaiv. Handbooks of the Soviet epoch stated that on August 15, 1919 the city party committee instructed Ivan Chigirin and Akim to leave for Odessa and hand over party documents to the Odessa regional party committee. After accomplishing the mission both Chigin and Rovner became available to revolutionary military council of the 11th Army (Red Army) which fought the Ukrainian People's Army. Chigirin and Rovner heroically perished in one of the battles.

Controversy on money embezzlement 
A collection of materials on history of the revolutionary movement in Central Ukraine "Years of Struggle" was published in Zinovyevsk in November 1927 where I. Radionov, an active participant of the revolutionary events, recalled: "At that time Akim has arrived from the Central Committee. He found the work of revolutionary committee satisfactory and stated that the only obstacle is the lack of funds. He left 50,000 rubles of his 100,000 available for the Odessa Military Revolutionary Committee for the Lyzavethrad Military Revolutionary Committee (VRK). Lyzavethrad VRK faced a lot of work to organize partisan units and to prepare them for an armed takeover which all that required a huge amount of money. Shortly after the departure of Akim, Mogilevsky has arrived..." The modern Ukrainian historian, writer and ethnographer Victor A. Savchenko wrote in his book "The civil war adventurers: historian investigation": "In Odessa State Archives I discovered a sensational materials of embezzlement of money of the 3rd Ukrainian Soviet Army by wives of the Soviet commanders and party functionaries". He cites a number of examples and further: "About one million rubles and jewelry routed also into the hands of comrades, the Odessa party functioniers Akim and Chigrin. In September of 1919 they completely disappeared with the money. Perhaps, they left for Europe through Romania.

In those "cursed days" (Ivan Bunin) anyone could have easily vanish. Apparently, therefore, there is no exact data about the circumstances of how Akim and his friend Ivan Chigrin have perished. Or they exist, but they not yet have been reached the hand of a researcher...

Further reading
 Pavlik, I., Lifanov, V., Mychakovskaya, L. Mykolaiv: Streets tell. "Mayak". Odessa, 1988.

External links
 Anatoliy Sorochan. He was called Comrade Akim. "Mykolaiv Public-political Independent Newspaper". 2011-05-12.
 Pinkhus Rovner at Handbook on history of the Communist Party and the Soviet Union 1898–1991

1875 births
1919 deaths
Politicians from Mykolaiv
People from Kherson Governorate
Ukrainian Jews
Bolsheviks
Communist Party of Ukraine (Soviet Union) politicians
Central Committee of the Communist Party of Ukraine (Soviet Union) members